The Time We Were Not in Love (lit. The Time I've Loved You) is a 2015 South Korean television series starring Ha Ji-won and Lee Jin-wook, adapted from the award-winning 2011 Taiwanese drama In Time with You. It aired on SBS from June 27 to August 16, 2015 on Saturdays and Sundays at 22:00 for 16 episodes.

Plot
Oh Ha-na and Choi Won are both 34 years old and have been best friends since high school. For the past seventeen years they have been present for every milestone in each other's lives; but, through missed timing, a romance has never developed between them.

Cast

Main
Ha Ji-won as Oh Ha-na
Lee Jin-wook as Choi Won
Yoon Kyun-sang as Cha Seo-hoo
Choo Soo-hyun as Lee So-eun

Supporting

People around Oh Ha-na
Shin Jung-geun as Oh Jung-geun, Ha-na’s father
Seo Ju-hee as Kim Soo-mi, Ha-na’s mother
Lee Joo-seung as Oh Dae-bok, Ha-na’s younger brother

People around Choi Won
Jin Kyung as Choi Mi-hyang
Kang Rae-yeon as Kang Na-young, Ha-na and Won’s friend
Choi Dae-chul
Jang Hee-soo as Choi Won's mother
Lee Dong-jin as Song Min-gook
Jang Sung-won as Bong Woo-jin
Seo Dong-gun as Jang Dong-gun

People at Tandy
Choi Jung-won as Joo Ho-joon, Ha-na’s two-timing ex-boyfriend
Woo Hyun as Byun Woo-sik
Hong In-young as Hwang Bit-na
Ko Won-hee as Yoon Min-ji
Park Doo-shik as Eun Dae-yoon	
Woohee as Hong Eun-jung, Ha-na’s hoobae and later Dae-bok’s girlfriend

Guest and cameo appearances
Jo Young-gu as Manager at shoe company (episode 1)
Hong Seok-cheon as Airplane passenger (episode 1)
Park Joon-myun
Kim Myung-soo as Ki Sung-jae (episodes 2–4)
Choo Sung-hoon (episode 2)
Yoon Sang-hyun (episode 2)
On Joo-wan (episode 2)
Shin Eun-kyung as Gu Yeon-jung (episode 3)
Jang Su-won
Park Jong-hoon as Professor

Production
Television director Jo Soo-won (I Can Hear Your Voice, Pinocchio) and screenwriter Min Hyo-jung (Rooftop Room Cat, Full House) were originally hired for the series. Then on May 15, 2015 Jo dropped out of the project due to "creative differences" with production company iWill Media; he returned a week later on 22 May, and a statement was released that Min had been replaced with screenwriters Jung Do-yoon (Grudge: The Revolt of Gumiho, Baby Faced Beauty) and Lee Ha-na (Cunning Single Lady).

The series' first teaser trailer was released online on June 6, 2015, then taken down a few days later after its concept was confirmed to have been plagiarized from the 2014 animated short film Jinxy Jenkins, Lucky Lou.

Ratings
In the table below, the blue numbers represent the lowest ratings and the red numbers represent the highest ratings.

Original soundtrack

Awards and nominations

References

External links
 

Seoul Broadcasting System television dramas
2015 South Korean television series debuts
2015 South Korean television series endings
South Korean television series based on non-South Korean television series
South Korean romantic comedy television series
Television series by IWill Media
In Time with You